is a Japanese politician, currently a member of the House of Councillors in the Diet (Japanese national legislature). He is a member of the Liberal Democratic Party, and affiliated to the revisionist lobby Nippon Kaigi. A graduate of a high school in Chiba Prefecture, he served in the assembly of Chiba Prefecture since 2003, and was elected to the national House in 2007.

Political career

 Secretary to a Member of the House of Representatives
 Prefectural Assembly member
 Chairperson, Committee on Budget, HC
 Chief Director, Committee on the Cabinet, HC
 Acting-Chairperson, LDP Diet Affairs Committee on the House of Councillors, LDP
 Acting Director, Cabinet Division, LDP
(source:)

References

External links 
  in Japanese.

Members of the House of Councillors (Japan)
Living people
1957 births
Members of Nippon Kaigi
Liberal Democratic Party (Japan) politicians